Eslamabad (also Romanized as Eslāmābād) is a village in Miandorud-e Bozorg Rural District, in the Central District of Miandorud County, Mazandaran Province, Iran. At the 2006 census, its population was 3,362, in 904 families.

References 

Populated places in Miandorud County